William R. Traver (born October 26, 1818) was a Michigan politician.

Early life
Traver was born in Rensselaer County, New York on October 26, 1818. In 1844, Traver moved to Litchfield Township, Michigan.

Career
Traver was a harness maker. On November 2, 1852, Traver was elected to the Michigan House of Representatives where he represented the Hillsdale County 1st district from January 5, 1853 to December 31, 1854. Traver held a number of local offices in Litchfield Township. In 1858, Traver served as highway commissioner of the township. In 1859, Traver served as overseer of the poor, along with Hervey Smith. In 1861, Traver again served as highway commissioner. In 1877, Traver served as drain commissioner. On March 12, 1877, the newly incorporated Litchfield village, which would later become the city of Litchfield, held its first election. In it, Traver was elected the village's first street commissioner.

References

1818 births
Year of death unknown
City and town treasurers in the United States
People from Rensselaer County, New York
People from Hillsdale County, Michigan
Republican Party members of the Michigan House of Representatives
19th-century American politicians